Ewige Blumenkraft (German: "eternal flower power" or "flower power forever") is given in Robert Shea and Robert Anton Wilson's 1975 Illuminatus! Trilogy as a slogan or password of the Illuminati.

Since "flower power" is a modern concept advanced by hippies, it is likely that Shea and Wilson intended this as a joke, although, characteristically, they never say so.  They attribute the disclosure of this slogan to an article by Shea written under the pseudonym "Sandra Glass" in the magazine TeenSet for March 1969. Another possibility is that the rose and lotus flower are an important symbol of spiritual development in both the western and eastern mystery schools.

Ewige Blumenkraft und ewige Schlangenkraft is also offered in Illuminatus! as the complete version of this motto. The text translates "Schlangenkraft" as "serpent power"; thus "Ewige Blumenkraft und ewige Schlangenkraft" means "eternal flower power and eternal serpent power" and may allude to the conjoinment of cross and rose within the alchemical furnace.  In this interpretation, the authors seem to suggest sexual magic as the secret or a secret of the Illuminati. "Schlangenkraft" likely translates the title of Arthur Avalon's classic The Serpent Power, where it refers to the Kundalini. The term was used as publisher's imprint for the first edition of the Simon Necronomicon.

Illuminatus! quotes Glass as claiming that the phrase figured in an incident involving Chicago Mayor Richard J. Daley and Senator Abraham A. Ribicoff during the 1968 Democratic National Convention.  After Ribicoff criticized Mayor Daley for instructing the Chicago Police Department to deal harshly with anti-war demonstrators, Daley shouted something inaudible at Ribicoff, leading to widespread speculation about what Daley had said.  The Teenset article, according to Illuminatus!, introduces the novel theory that Daley shouted "Ewige Blumenkraft!" -- presumably marking Daley as a member of the Illuminati.

Sandra Glass was a pseudonym for Robert Shea, who was playing a prank on the readers of TeenSet.  The article (as quoted in Illuminatus!) cites Simon Moon—a fictional character from Illuminatus!, as well as one of Robert Anton Wilson's pen names—as the source of its background information on the Illuminati.

In popular culture
Ewige Blumenkraft is also the title of an album by the German Stoner/Psychedelic rock group Colour Haze.

"Ewige Blumenkraft" is the title of a song by the German punk rock group Die Ärzte.

Blumenkraft is the title of a psychedelic dub album by Ott.

Ewige Blumenkraft is the name of an achievement in the Xbox 360 LIVE Arcade game Space Giraffe.

Robert Anton Wilson
Illuminati